Frederick Carder (September 18, 1863 – December 10, 1963) was a glassmaker, glass designer, and glass artist who was active in the glass industry in both England and the United States, notably for Stevens & Williams and Steuben, respectively. Known for his experimentation with form and color, Carder's work remains popular among collectors and can be found in numerous museum collections, including The Corning Museum of Glass, which houses the Frederick Carder Gallery, Chrysler Museum of Art, and the Detroit Institute of Arts. He was born in Staffordshire, England, and died in Corning, New York, where he had made his home since 1903.

Family life 
Frederick Carder was born in the village of Wordsley, near Stourbridge, in Staffordshire, England on September 18, 1863, to parents Caleb and Ann Carder. Caleb Carder worked as a salesperson for his father, George Carder, at his pottery, Ley's, formed around 1810. Caleb and his brothers (Frederick's uncles) Joshua and Henry took over the pottery after George died, though Caleb ran the pottery alone for many years. After Caleb's retirement, Frederick's younger brothers Albert and Arthur took over. Frederick Carder also had older brothers named Will and George and an older sister named Annie.

Frederick Carder married Annie Walker on May 21, 1887, in Dudley, Worcestershire. They had three children: a daughter Gladys (1889–1969), a son Stanley (1892–29th January 1899), and a son Cyril (1893–1918). Annie died in May 1943.

Education 
Carder left school at age 14 to work in his father's pottery. He enrolled in night school at the Strourbridge School of Art and the Dudley Mechanic Institute, where he studied chemistry. In 1891, Carder started the Wordsley School of Art for glassworkers. In 1960, Alfred University honored Carder with an honorary doctorate degree.

Career

Stevens & Williams (1881–1903)
Frederick Carder began his glassmaking career with Stevens & Williams in 1881, where he helped re-introduce colored glass.  While at Stevens & Williams, Carder worked with Peter Fabergé of Russia.  In 1902, Carder was asked to compile a survey of current glassmaking techniques in other countries, including the United States.

After 20 years of glass design and glassmaking experience, disagreements developed within Stevens & Williams. As a result, Carder and his family emigrated to the United States.

Steuben (1903–1932)
Frederick Carder and Thomas G. Hawkes (of Hawkes crystal) co-founded the Steuben Glass Works in Corning, NY, the home of Corning Glass Company (also known as Corning Glass Works).  Carder ran Steuben Glass Works from 1903 until 1932.

In 1918, Corning Glass purchased Steuben Glass Works, with Frederick Carder continuing to manage all aspects of the business. 1932, the advent of the Great Depression had a negative impact on business at Steuben.  Corning Glass terminated the production of colored glass and took over the direction of the Steuben division, Carder was made artistic director for all Corning divisions.

page 71 "History of the Corning Painted Post Area : 200 Years in Painted Post Country" (revised edition published in 1991) by Thomas P. Dimitroff and Lois S. Janes has the name of Thomas G. Hawkes who was a founder of the Steuben Glass Works with Frederick Carder.  Thomas Gibbons Hawkes came from England and was formerly foreman of J. Hoare & Company. Thomas G. Hawkes established the Hawkes Rich Cut  Glass Works on March 12, 1882.

After Steuben (1932–1959)
In 1932, Steuben Glass Works reorganized under a new team headed by Arthur A. Houghton, Jr., John Gates, and Sidney Waugh.  Using a new glass known as G10M, Steuben crystal products became colorless and clear.  While not specifically managing Steuben operations, Frederic Carder continued in Corning by directing all aspects of Corning's design, manufacturing, and marketing of many glass products. During this period, he experimented with glass casting using the cire perdue (lost wax) method used in metal foundries. The artistry of his design was acknowledged by the award of the Binns Medal in 1934. He made his notes and formulas available to others wishing to cast glass. 

In 1943, Carder's wife Annie died.  In 1959, Carder retired from Corning Glass Works. He died in December 1963, eighty-three days after his 100th birthday.

An elementary school located in Corning was given the name Frederick Carder School in his honor.

In 2005 Steuben Gallery, in Manhattan, mounted an exhibition of Carder's work that was curated by Donald Albrecht. The exhibition, called Frederick Carder: Glass, Passion, Invention, was designed by Pure+Applied. Photographs of the exhibition .

Works cited

Further reading

The Glass of Frederick Carder – Paul V. Gardner (1971)
Frederick Carder and Steuben Glass – Thomas P. Dimitroff (1998)
A Guide to Colored Steuben Glass (Book 1) – Eric Erickson (1965)
A Guide to Colored Steuben Glass (Book 2) – Eric Erickson (1965)
Steuben Glass – James S. Plaut (1971)
Frederick Carder's Steuben Glass – Marshall Ketchum (2002)
Carder's Steuben Glass – John F. Hotchkiss (1964)
Steuben: Seventy Years of American Glassmaking – Perrot, Gardner, Plaut (1974)
Asian Artists in Crystal – Steuben Glass (1956)
Poetry in Crystal – Steuben Glass (1963)
The Art of Steuben – Steuben Glass (1972)
A Primer of Glass Design – Steuben Glass
Alan Shovers;  Evansville Museum of Arts, History and Science. Objects of desire : the art of Frederick Carder : the Alan and Susan Shovers collection of Steuben glass (Evansville, Ind. : Evansville Museum of Arts, History and Science, 2005) (Worldcat link:) ;

See also
Steuben Glass
Corning Inc. (formerly Corning Glass Works)
The Houghton Family
The City of Corning, NY

External links
The Carder Fish Vase - Andrew Lineham
Official Steuben Glass website
The Frederick Carder Notebook Collection, 1867-1948 is held at the Rakow Research Library of the Corning Museum of Glass. (Retrieved 23 October 2015)
The Carder Steuben Club

Glass makers
1863 births
1963 deaths
American glass artists
English centenarians
Men centenarians
People from Stourbridge
People from Corning, New York
British emigrants to the United States
British glass artists